Lasiocercis is a genus of longhorn beetles of the subfamily Lamiinae.

subgenus Coptomimus
 Lasiocercis albosignata Breuning, 1965
 Lasiocercis bipenicillata (Fairmaire, 1904)
 Lasiocercis catalai (Lepesme & Villiers, 1944)
 Lasiocercis ciliata (Lepesme & Villiers, 1944)
 Lasiocercis fuscosignatus Breuning, 1970
 Lasiocercis madagascariensis Breuning, 1945
 Lasiocercis nigropunctatus Breuning, 1966
 Lasiocercis ochreoapicalis Breuning, 1957
 Lasiocercis ochreopicta Breuning, 1980
 Lasiocercis pilosa Breuning, 1957
 Lasiocercis rufotibialis Breuning, 1957
 Lasiocercis viossati Breuning, 1970
 Lasiocercis ziczac Breuning, 1970

subgenus Lasiocercis
 Lasiocercis affinis Breuning, 1965
 Lasiocercis bigibba (Fairmaire, 1896)
 Lasiocercis bigibboides Breuning, 1970
 Lasiocercis fasciata Waterhouse, 1882
 Lasiocercis limbolaria (Fairmaire, 1894)
 Lasiocercis nigrofasciata Breuning, 1964
 Lasiocercis nigrosignata Breuning, 1965
 Lasiocercis niveosignata Breuning, 1957
 Lasiocercis ochreomaculata Breuning, 1965
 Lasiocercis paraperroti Breuning, 1969
 Lasiocercis parvula Breuning, 1965
 Lasiocercis perroti Breuning, 1957
 Lasiocercis posticefasciata (Lepesme & Villiers, 1944)
 Lasiocercis semiarcuata Breuning, 1957
 Lasiocercis similis Breuning, 1965
 Lasiocercis subbigibboides Breuning, 1971
 Lasiocercis transversefasciata Breuning, 1965
 Lasiocercis tricoloripennis Breuning, 1965
 Lasiocercis truncata (Lepesme & Villiers, 1944)
 Lasiocercis truncatoides Breuning, 1975
 Lasiocercis vadoni Breuning, 1957
 Lasiocercis villiersi Breuning, 1940
 Lasiocercis viridana Breuning, 1940

subgenus Mistocles
 Lasiocercis elegantula Fairmaire, 1899

subgenus Paramistocles
 Lasiocercis medioflava Breuning, 1980

References

Crossotini